Aaron Mordechai Feuerstein (December 11, 1925 – November 4, 2021)
 was an American industrialist, philanthropist, and the third-generation owner and CEO of Malden Mills in Lawrence, Massachusetts. Some remember him as “The mensch who saved Christmas” when he publicly said “I am not throwing three thousand people out of work, two weeks before their holiday.” 

After a major fire at Young Israel of Brookline, a synagogue founded by his father, Feuerstein donated $1,000,000 to help rebuild.

Early life and education
Feuerstein, a Jew, was born in Brookline, Massachusetts, on December 11, 1925. He attended Boston Latin School and graduated from Yeshiva University in 1947, majoring in English and philosophy.

Career
When the Malden Mills factory burned down on December 11, 1995, Feuerstein used his insurance money to rebuild it, and to pay the salaries of all the now-unemployed workers while it was being rebuilt. Feuerstein spent millions keeping all 3,000 employees on the payroll with full benefits for ninety days.  He came to prominence globally by going against common business practices, especially at a time when many companies were downsizing and moving overseas.  "By the end of 1996 the plant was rebuilt."

Feuerstein said that he could not have taken another course of action due to his study of the Talmud and the lessons he learned there:

This cost Feuerstein $25,000,000, his CEO position, and a November 2001 filing of chapter 11 bankruptcy. The company achieved solvency again with the help of creditor generosity and government subsidies. Malden Mills later garnered some lucrative Department of Defense (DOD) contracts for "smart" products that interweave fiber optic cabling, electronic biosensors, and USB ports into polar fleece fabric. Malden Mills was awarded a $16 million DOD contract in 2006. In January 2007, however, Malden Mills filed for bankruptcy again and ended production in July. The company's underfunded (by 49%) pension was abandoned due to sale of corporate assets.

Personal life
Feuerstein was an alumnus of Camp Modin in Belgrade, Maine, and the keynote speaker at the 75th annual reunion in 1997. Feuerstein was also a member of Young Israel of Brookline.

Feuerstein died of pneumonia on November 4, 2021, in a Boston hospital at the age of 95.

Family
Feuerstein married twice; both wives predeceased him. His surviving descendants include 3 children and six grandchildren.

Honors
An industrialist and philanthropist, for setting the standard for commitment to employees following a devastating fire at his Malden Mills manufacturing plant, he was awarded the Peace Abbey Courage of Conscience Award on March 13, 1998.

References

Further reading
 Jennings, Marianne M., Business: Its Legal, Ethical, and Global Environment, Cengage Learning, 2005. Cf. p.775 for a biography of Aaron Feuerstein.

External links 
 The Mensch Of Malden Mills (CBS 60 Minutes)
 Malden Mills Bankruptcy Filing Information and Documents

1925 births
2021 deaths
20th-century American Jews
21st-century American Jews
American chief executives of manufacturing companies
American industrialists
Boston Latin School alumni
Jewish American philanthropists
People from Brookline, Massachusetts
Yeshiva University alumni